More Beautiful Than Silence is an EP by Canadian rapper K'naan, released on January 31, 2012.

Track listing

References

2012 EPs
K'naan albums
A&M Octone Records EPs
Albums produced by Ryan Tedder